Henry Kondracki (born 1953) is a Scottish artist based in Edinburgh. He studied at the Byam Shaw School of Art, London and the Slade School of Fine Art, London  (1982–1986). He has received the Cheltenham Drawing Prize (1999), the Hunting Art Prize (2004) and has twice been the recipient of the Slade Fine Art Prize. His work has been widely exhibited in the U.K and abroad.

A dozen of his oil paintings are in UK public collections, including Glasgow Museums and Manchester City Art Gallery.

References

External links
Biography
Henry Kondracki's website
Artwork at the Flowers East Gallery London
Artwork at the Open Eye Gallery Edinburgh

20th-century Scottish painters
Scottish male painters
21st-century Scottish painters
21st-century Scottish male artists
1953 births
Artists from Edinburgh
Living people
Alumni of the Byam Shaw School of Art
Alumni of the Slade School of Fine Art
20th-century Scottish male artists